Barkley (formerly Barkley Evergreen & Partners) is a Kansas City, Missouri, United States, based full-service advertising agency known for their work on Sonic Drive-In Restaurants , Planet Fitness, and Dairy Queen.  Founded in 1964, they employ 400+ people; 2008 capitalized billings were $485 million. Barkley is the largest independent advertising agency in Kansas City, and the seventh-largest independent advertising agency in the U.S.

Acquisitions
In March 2008, Barkley acquired  Ripple Effects Interactive. The new venture was re-branded BarkleyREI.

References

External links
 Official website
 BarkleyREI

Advertising agencies of the United States
Companies based in Kansas City, Missouri
Public relations companies of the United States
Direct marketing